Thomas Audley, 1st Baron Audley of Walden KG, PC, KS, JP (30 April 1544), was an English barrister and judge who served as Lord Chancellor of England from 1533 to 1544.

Early life
Audley was born in Earls Colne, Essex, the son of Geoffrey Audley, and is believed to have studied at Buckingham College, Cambridge, now known as Magdalene College. He was educated for the law, entered the Inner Temple, was named town clerk of Colchester in 1514, and became Justice of the Peace for Essex in November 1520.

Career in Parliament
In 1523 Audley was returned to Parliament for Essex, and represented this constituency in subsequent Parliaments. In 1527 he was Groom of the Chamber, and became a member of Wolsey's household. On the fall of the latter in 1529, he was made Chancellor of the Duchy of Lancaster, and the same year Speaker of the House of Commons, presiding over the famous assembly styled the Reformation Parliament, which abolished the papal jurisdiction. The same year he headed a deputation of the Commons to the king to complain of Bishop Fisher's speech against their proceedings. He interpreted the King's "moral" scruples to parliament concerning his marriage with Catherine of Aragon, and made himself the instrument of the King in the attack upon the clergy and the preparation of the Act of Supremacy.

In 1531 he had been made a serjeant-at-law and king's serjeant; and on 20 May 1532 he was knighted, and succeeded Sir Thomas More as Lord Keeper of the Great Seal, being appointed Lord Chancellor on 26 January 1533. He supported the king's divorce from Catherine and the marriage with Anne Boleyn; and presided at the trials of Fisher and More in 1535, at which his conduct and evident intention to secure a conviction has been criticised by some. Next year he was part of the trial of Anne Boleyn and her "lovers" for treason and adultery. The execution of the king's wife left him free to declare the king's daughter Princess Elizabeth a bastard, and for Henry to marry Anne's maid, Jane Seymour. Audley was a witness to the queen's execution, and recommended to Parliament the new Act of Succession, which made Jane Seymour's issue legitimate.

In 1537 he condemned to death as traitors the  rebels of the Pilgrimage of Grace. On 29 November 1538 he was created Baron Audley of Walden; and soon afterwards presided as Lord Steward at the trials of Henry Pole, Lord Montacute, and of the Marquess of Exeter. In 1539, inclining to the Protestant Reformation, he made himself the King's instrument in enforcing religious conformity, and in the passing of the Six Articles Act.

Other activities
On 24 April 1540 he was made a Knight of the Garter, and subsequently managed the attainder of Thomas Cromwell, and the dissolution of Henry's marriage with Anne of Cleves. This was despite having previously been a strong ally of Cromwell. In 1542 he warmly supported the privileges of the Commons, but his conduct was inspired as usual by subservience to the court, which desired to secure a subsidy, and his opinion that the arrest was a flagrant contempt has been questioned by good authority.

He received several grants of monastic estates, including Holy Trinity Priory in Aldgate, London and Walden Abbey, Essex, where his grandson, Thomas Howard, 1st Earl of Suffolk, built Audley End, doubtless named after him. In 1542 he endowed and re-established Buckingham College, Cambridge, under the new name of the College of St Mary Magdalene (commonly Magdalene College), and ordained in the statutes that his heirs, "the possessors of the late monastery of Walden" should be Visitors of Magdalene College in perpetuum. The power to appoint the Master of the College was vested in the Visitor until an amendment to the College Statutes in 2012. The arms of Magdalene are derived from his.

A Booke of Orders for the Warre both by Sea and Land (Harleian MS. 297, 144) is attributed to his authorship.

Marriages and progeny

Lord Audley married twice:
Firstly to Christina (or Margaret) Barnardiston, a daughter of Sir Thomas Barnardiston (died 1503), of Kedington, Suffolk;
Secondly to Elizabeth Grey, a daughter of Thomas Grey, 2nd Marquess of Dorset, by whom he had two daughters, including:
Margaret Audley, who married as her second husband Thomas Howard, 4th Duke of Norfolk, by whom her eldest son was Thomas Howard, 1st Earl of Suffolk, 1st Baron Howard de Walden, created Baron Howard de Walden in 1597 and Earl of Suffolk in 1603.

Death and burial
He resigned the great seal on 21 April 1544, and died on 30 April and was buried at Saffron Walden, where he had prepared for himself a splendid tomb. As he died without male progeny his barony became extinct at his death. One of his daughters, Margaret, married as her second husband Thomas Howard, 4th Duke of Norfolk. Their elder son Lord Thomas Howard was created Baron Howard de Walden in 1597 and Earl of Suffolk in 1603. St Michael's Church, Berechurch in Essex has a monument to him in the Audley Chapel.

References

1480s births
1544 deaths
Year of birth uncertain
16th-century English lawyers
16th-century English nobility
Barons in the Peerage of England
Peers of England created by Henry VIII
English justices of the peace
English MPs 1523
English MPs 1529–1536
Knights of the Garter
Lord chancellors of England
Lord High Stewards
Members of the Middle Temple
Members of the Privy Council of England
Serjeants-at-law (England)
Speakers of the House of Commons of England
Thomas
Founders of colleges of the University of Cambridge